The West South Line of Chennai Suburban Railway is the longest line running west-south from Chennai (Madras) City covering a distance of almost 289 km. Suburban services terminate at Arakkonam and MEMU services currently run till Vellore Cantonment which will be extended up to Villupuram upon completion of Vellore Cantonment and Villupuram section.

Chennai Central - Thiruvallur 
 This section has 2 dedicated lines for suburban train operations apart from 2 main line for mixed traffic.
 EMUs are operated along 3rd and 4th main lines during peak hours.
 5th and 6th rail lines are planned.
 9-car and 12-car EMU are operated in this sector.

Thiruvallur - Arakkonam 

 This section also has 2 dedicated lines for suburban train operations apart from 2 main line for mixed traffic.

 9-car, 12-car EMU & MEMU are operated in this sector.

Arakkonam - Katpadi 

 8-car MEMU are operated in this sector.

Katpadi - Vellore Cantonment 

 MEMU service operate between Chennai Beach and Vellore Cantonment via Katpadi.

Vellore Cantonment -Tiruvannamalai- Villupuram 

 This section has been gauge converted and is being electrified along with passenger services are operating since June. Currently five passenger trains ply over this section

Chennai Suburban Railway